The 1906 VFL Grand Final was an Australian rules football game contested between the Carlton Football Club and Fitzroy Football Club, held at the Melbourne Cricket Ground in Melbourne on 22 September 1906. It was the 9th annual Grand Final of the Victorian Football League, staged to determine the premiers for the 1906 VFL season. The match, attended by 44,437 spectators, was won by Carlton by a margin of 49 points, marking that club's first VFL premiership victory.

Lead-up

After the home-and-away season (which lasted for seventeen matches, including the "first round" of fourteen matches and a "second round" of three matches), Carlton was top of the ladder with a record of 14–3 and a percentage of 153.5; Fitzroy finished second with a record of 13–4 and a percentage of 153.3.

The finals were contested using the variation of the amended Argus system seen between 1902–1906. Fitzroy faced fourth-placed  in the First Semi-Final, and won by 36 points, and Carlton faced third-placed  in the Second Semi-Final and won by ten points. Carlton and Fitzroy then faced off to decide the premiers.

Right to challenge
The winner of this match would automatically win the premiership; no team had the right to challenge for the premiership this season. Under the variation of the Argus System in use between 1902–1906, the club with the best record in all matches (including finals) could have challenged for the premiership if it had not won this game.

However, whichever team won this game would have become the team with the best record, depriving the other of any right to challenge. Entering the match, Carlton had a record of 15–3, and Fitzroy had a record of 14–4 but a superior percentage (155.6 to Carlton's 151.2).

In the event of a Carlton win, Carlton's 16–3 record would have ranked above Fitzroy's 14–5, but in the event of a Fitzroy win, both clubs would have been level on 15–4, but Fitzroy would have been ranked above Carlton with a superior percentage.

This is different from the ruling which would have been used under the more widely known variation of the Argus System, which was in use from 1907–1930, with the exception of 1924. In that variation, the team with the best record in matches excluding finals had the right to challenge; as Carlton had the best record after 17 weeks, it would have retained the right to challenge, regardless of finals results.

Teams

 Umpire – Bert Wregg

Statistics

Goalkickers

References

See also
 1906 VFL season

VFL/AFL Grand Finals
Grand
Carlton Football Club
Fitzroy Football Club
September 1906 sports events